Andrew O'Donnell is a Scottish actor and was a co-founder of the Glasgow Filmmakers Alliance. He served as the director of the organisation from its conception before stepping down from the role on 30 June 2019.his age is currently 42.
 As an actor, he is possibly best known for the role of Jimmy Guinness in the film The Greyness of Autumn.

Biography
From a young age, O'Donnell was keen on acting. At school he performed in a wide variety of productions and achieved Grade 8 in Musical Theatre from The London College of Music. After achieving an HND award in Acting and Performance at Langside College he went on to graduate from the University of the West of Scotland with a degree in Contemporary Screen Acting.

In 2011, he made a cameo appearance in the film Perfect Sense as a night clubber. He also provided the voice for the characters of Harbour Master and the Cameraman in the Scottish feature film In Search of La Che. The following year, he landed the role of Jimmy Guinness in the film The Greyness of Autumn. O'Donnell's performance was widely praised by critics with John McArthur of Moviescramble saying "His scene was laugh out loud funny and still raises a smile when thinking about it." Mark Bell of Film Threat wrote "Whether it's Jimmy the construction worker who has a mishap on the job or the awfully-wigged bartender, everyone buys into the general tone of dry and matter-of-fact delivery, even when conversing with a puppet or getting into a fight with one. It gives the entire experience a wonderful flavour."

O'Donnell has also performed in theatre including a version of The Dumb Waiter by Harold Pinter which was produced by the Hipshot Theatre company in Ayr. In preparation for the role, O'Donnell and his co-star Chris Taylor locked themselves in solitary confinement to appreciated the situations the characters are facing in the play.

Glasgow Filmmakers Alliance

O'Donnell co-founded the Glasgow Filmmakers Alliance with Chris Quick in October 2011. The non-profit organisation hosts an online database with the details of film industry professionals and companies operating in and around the city of Glasgow.

In 2012, the alliance was invited by Stephen Paton of Production Attic to form what would become the Glasgow Creative Network which hosts networking events for media professionals in Glasgow.

In 2014, O'Donnell and Quick wrote an open letter on behalf of the independent filmmakers of Glasgow to the director of BAFTA Scotland, Jude MacLaverty. In the letter, the pair asked the film body to consider a proposal of including three new awards at the annual ceremony aimed at low budget / independent filmmakers. On 28 October, it was announced that the proposal would be placed on the agenda of the next Bafta Scotland Committee meeting in December 2014.

Roundsquare Roastery

In September 2013, O'Donnell became the head of sales and new business for the Roundsquare Roastery coffee company in Ayr.

Filmography

Film

Stage

References

External links

Glasgow Filmmakers Alliance Website
Andrew O'Donnell Ayr TV Interview

Living people
Scottish male film actors
Scottish male stage actors
21st-century Scottish male actors
Year of birth missing (living people)